Malikappuram is a 2022 Indian Malayalam-language action-adventure drama film directed by Vishnu Sasi Shankar, written by Abhilash Pillai and starring Unni Mukundan,Saiju Kurup,Ramesh Pisharody, Manoj K.Jayan and Renji Panicker in the lead roles. 

Malikappuram was released theatrically on 30 December 2022. The film received positive reviews from audiences.

Plot 
Kalyani alias Kallu is a devotee of god Ayyappan, and is enthusiastic to visit the Sabarimala temple. As per the religious beliefs, Kallu has a small window of two years to visit the temple as she is 8 years old. Her grandmother narrates legends and stories of Lord Ayyappan to her, which she loves a lot. Her father, Ajayan, has mortgaged their house, and it is on the verge of being seized by the bank. Furthermore, he has also borrowed a big sum from a local usurer and acquitance, Ambadi. He is unable to repay both the loans.

The bank has issued a seizure notice, which Ajayan hides from his family. Ajayan promises Kallu to take her to Sabarimala and that both will do the initial rituals for the pilgrimage, which is supposed to happen a few weeks from thereon. Ambadi publicly harasses and roughs up Ajayan, which is witnessed by Kallu. A humiliated Ajayan subsequently commits suicide out of disgrace. The bank eventually seizes Ajayan's house, and Kallu’s grandmother moves in with Ajayan’s elder sister. Kallu and her mother move in with Ajayan’s friend and neighbor, Unni. Kallu becomes frustrated with the fact that she is unable to go to Sabarimala, and yells at her good friend and classmate Piyoosh, Unni’s son. 

Piyoosh finds that it is impossible to dissuade Kallu from pursuing her journey to Sabarimala, and decides to accompany her. Both the kids board a bus to Pamba, and en route they meet Mahi, a local goon who is also a paedophile and trafficker. Under the pretense of heading to Sabarimala, he is on the lookout for young kids. His eyes fall on both Kallu and Piyoosh. Piyoosh senses that something is off and tries to persuade Kallu to stop the journey and go back home, but to no avail. Meanwhile, Unni and Kallu's mother inform the police about the missing duo.

Later, a man named Ayyappan boards the bus, who also seems to be heading to Sabarimala, and gets acquainted with the kids. Mahi introduces himself as the kids’ guardian uncle to Ayyappan, which Ayyappan later finds out to be false and suspects that he has some malicious intentions. After hearing their story, Ayyappan promises the kids that he will accompany them to Sabarimala. Ayyappan intimidates Mahi and an infuriated Mahi is determined to incapacitate Ayyappan and kidnap the girl. On reaching Pamba, from where they have to walk by foot to reach the shrine, the trio discover that the police have restricted entry for the remainder of the day, as a measure to control the crowd, and they will not be able to visit the temple. But an adamant Kallu leaves Ayyappan with no choice except to take a route through the forest. 

Mahi’s accomplice who has been following them, informs Mahi about their movements, and he sends all of his henchmen to beat up Ayyappan and kidnap Kallu. During the journey, Ayyappan is alerted, he successfully overpowers Mahi and his people. During the fight, Kallu is shown to be hallucinating about Ayyappan being the actual embodiment of Ayyapan, and later reveals to him that she has seen him in her dreams, and shows him the drawings she made about them, which show a man who looks just like Ayyappan. The following day, Ayyappan disappears into the crowd and the kids enter the shrine. As Kallu begins to worry and look for him, he shows up and encourages her to climb the steps, to fulfill her father's wish. Later, the police hands the kids over to Unni and they are taken home.

It is then revealed that Ayyappan is actually CPO D. Ayyappadas, working at the police station in Pamba. He was alerted of the missing children and knowingly boarded the bus after having seen Kallu's photo. Later by hearing out their stories, he decided to make their wish come true of visiting Sabarimala temple. Circumstances that followed made the kids believe that he was Ayyappan, himself. The police meanwhile apprehended Mahi and his men, who happened to be on Tamil Nadu criminal records.

Cast

Production
The shooting of the film began on 12 September 2022 after the pooja ceremony at Erumely Sree Dharmasastha Temple. The film was censored with a U-certificate one week prior to its release.

Music

The film score and the songs are composed by Ranjin Raj. The lyrics are written by Santhosh Varma and B.K.Harinarayanan. The album consists of eight songs. The first song "Ganapathi Thunayaruluka" was released on 17 December 2022.

Release
The film was released in theatres on 30 December 2022. The Telugu and Tamil language dubbed versions were released on 26 January 2023. The film premiered on Disney+ Hotstar on 15 February 2023.

Reception

Box office
The film collected  on its 11th day. In its fourth week, the film grossed ₹50 crore (US$6.3million) and became the biggest hit of Unni Mukundan's career.

References

External links

2020s Malayalam-language films
Indian action adventure films
2022 action adventure films
2022 films
Films shot in Kerala
Films set in Kerala
Films about God